Wild West Dynasty is a city-building simulation video game released in February 2023 on Steam developed by Moon Punch Studio and published by Toplitz Productions. Set in 19th-century Western United States, players can build their own ranch, provide food and wealth and more settlers join their settlements for happiness. The player can build, grow, and manage a town around it in an effort to "become the most powerful man in the West.".

References 

2023 video games
Windows games
Simulation video games